Ian Egerton (2 February 1931 – 21 April 2019) was an Australian rules footballer who played with Hawthorn in the Victorian Football League (VFL). Ian Egerton also played for Victoria in 1955 and was a loving father to his two sons.

Notes

External links 
		

1931 births
2019 deaths
Australian rules footballers from New South Wales
Hawthorn Football Club players
Deniliquin Football Club players